Omiodes diemenalis, the bean leafroller, is a moth in the family Crambidae. It was described by Achille Guenée in 1854. It is found in Indonesia (Sumatra, Ambon Island), Sri Lanka, India, the Cook Islands, China, Thailand, Papua New Guinea and Australia, where it has been recorded from the Northern Territory, Queensland and Tasmania.

The wingspan is about 20 mm. Adults are yellow with brown broad wavy bands and spots.

The larvae have been recorded feeding on Glycine max, Phaseolus vulgaris and Vigna radiata. They live in a shelter made from a rolled up leaf of the host plant.

References

Moths described in 1854
diemenalis